The 9th National Film Awards, then known as State Awards for Films, presented by Ministry of Information and Broadcasting, India to felicitate the best of Indian Cinema released in 1961. The awards were announced on 5 April 1962 and were presented on 21 April at the Vigyan Bhavan in New Delhi, by then Vice-President of India, Dr. Sarvepalli Radhakrishnan.

Selection process 
The Central Committee for State Awards for Films for the year was headed by politician and author R. R. Diwakar. To select films for the awards, the committee viewed "27 feature films, five children's films, seven documentaries and six educational films and a few filmstrips" between 19 March and 2 April 1962.

Awards 

Awards were divided into feature films and non-feature films.

President's Gold Medal for the All India Best Feature Film is now better known as National Film Award for Best Feature Film, whereas President's Gold Medal for the Best Documentary Film is analogous to today's National Film Award for Best Non-Feature Film. For children's films, Prime Minister's Gold Medal is now given as National Film Award for Best Children's Film. At the regional level, President's Silver Medal for Best Feature Film is now given as National Film Award for Best Feature Film in a particular language. Certificate of Merit in all the categories is discontinued over the years.

Feature films 

Feature films were awarded at All India as well as regional level. For the 9th National Film Awards, a Bengali film Bhagini Nivedita won the President's Gold Medal for the All India Best Feature Film. Following were the awards given:

All India Award 

Following were the awards given in each category:

Regional Award 

The awards were given to the best films made in the regional languages of India. For 9th National Film Awards, President's Silver Medal for Best Feature Film was not given in Gujarati, Kannada and Odia language; instead Certificate of Merit was awarded in each particular language.

Non-Feature films 

Non-feature film awards were given for the documentaries and educational films made in the country. Following were the awards given:

Documentaries

Educational films

Awards not given 

Following were the awards not given as no film was found to be suitable for the award:

 President's Silver Medal for Best Feature Film in Kannada
 President's Silver Medal for Best Feature Film in Oriya

References

External links 
 National Film Awards Archives
 Official Page for Directorate of Film Festivals, India

National Film Awards (India) ceremonies
1962 film awards
1962 in Indian cinema